Donna Cruz Sings Her Greatest Hits is the second compilation album by the Filipino singer Donna Cruz, released in the Philippines in 2001 by Viva Records. The album was Cruz's first album not to receive a PARI certification; all of her studio albums and a previous compilation album, The Best of Donna, were certified either gold or platinum. Though it was labeled as a greatest hits compilation, several songs on the track listing had not been released as singles, and some of Cruz's singles did not appear on the album.

Background
Released during Cruz's break from the entertainment industry, Donna Cruz Sings Her Greatest Hits did not include any newly recorded material. Cruz's version of "Jubilee Song", which was not found on any of Cruz's albums (as she never recorded studio albums after Hulog Ng Langit in 1999) was included. It was seen as an updated version of Cruz's greatest hits as it included her latest singles "Hulog ng Langit" and "Ikaw Pala 'Yon".

Track listing

References

2001 compilation albums
Viva Records (Philippines) compilation albums
Donna Cruz albums